Adam Shunk (born August 29, 1979) is an American high jumper.

Shunk earned a BA in Psychology from the University of North Carolina in 2003 and attained a PhD in Educational Psychology/Neuropsychology at Ball State University.  He competed for the NIKE Indiana Invaders Track Team, before becoming a NIKE athlete. He finished sixth at the 2007 Pan American Games. He also competed at the 2006 World Indoor Championships without reaching the final. Shunk is also the 2006 USA Indoor Champion. He also went to Delta High School in Muncie, Indiana.

His personal best jump is 2.30 metres, achieved in May 2005 in Santo Domingo.

Shunk now works as a neuropsychologist and sports psychologist in Duluth, Georgia.

References
 

1979 births
American male high jumpers
Living people
Place of birth missing (living people)
Athletes (track and field) at the 2007 Pan American Games
Pan American Games track and field athletes for the United States